Dhaminha is a village in West Champaran district in the Indian state of Bihar.

Demographics
As of 2011 India census, Dhaminha had a population of 2456 in 437 households. Males constitute 52.64% of the population and females 47.35%. Dhaminha has an average literacy rate of 46.29%, lower than the national average of 74%: male literacy is 63.23%, and female literacy is 36.76%. In Dhaminha, 20.31% of the population is under 6 years of age.

References

Villages in West Champaran district